The Arkansas Open was a golf tournament on the LPGA Tour, played only in 1956. It was played at the Country Club of Hot Springs in Hot Springs, Arkansas. Patty Berg won the event.

References

Former LPGA Tour events
Golf in Arkansas
1956 establishments in Arkansas
1956 disestablishments in Arkansas
History of women in Arkansas